Jonathan David O'Donnell (21 March 1954–April 1997) born in Leeds, England, was an English professional footballer who played as a fullback in The Football League for Leeds United, Cambridge United, Colchester United, Hartlepool United and Scunthorpe United. He moved into non-league football to play for Cambridge City in season 1981-82.  Left the club after the opening Southern League game in August 1984. O'Donnell died in April 1997.

References

External links

Player Profile - Jon O'Donnell

1954 births
1997 deaths
Footballers from Leeds
English footballers
Association football defenders
Leeds United F.C. players
Cambridge United F.C. players
Colchester United F.C. players
Hartlepool United F.C. players
Scunthorpe United F.C. players
Cambridge City F.C. players